Giorgio Carta may refer to:
 Giorgio Carta (politician)
 Giorgio Carta (engineer)